This page is a list of lists of languages.

Published lists 
SIL International's Ethnologue: Languages of the World lists over  spoken and signed languages.
The International Organization for Standardization (ISO) assigns codes for most languages; see ISO 639
 List of ISO 639-1 codes – two-letter codes (184 major languages)
 List of ISO 639-2 codes – three-letter codes
 ISO 639 macrolanguage – ISO 639-2 codes used as ISO 639-3 codes
 List of ISO 639-3 codes – three-letter codes, intended to "cover all known natural languages"
 List of ISO 639-5 codes – three-letter codes for language families and groups
IETF language tag – depends on ISO 639, but provides various expansion mechanisms
Glottolog
Linguasphere Observatory (LS-2010, totalling over 32,800 coded entries and over 70,900 linguistic names)

English Wikipedia list articles 
 Index of language articles

Comprehensive lists 
Lists which are global in scope (all living natural languages would classify for inclusion):
by country: 
List of official languages by country and territory
Number of languages by country
by name: List of language names (native names)
 by phylogenetic relation: List of language families (phylogenetic) 
 by primary language family: List of Afro-Asiatic languages, List of Austronesian languages, List of Indo-European languages, List of Mongolic languages, List of Tungusic languages, List of Turkic languages, List of Uralic languages.
 chronologically: List of languages by first written accounts
by number of speakers:
 List of languages by total number of speakers
 List of languages by number of native speakers
 List of languages by number of words according to authoritative dictionaries
 List of languages by writing system

By region 
 Languages of Africa
 Indigenous languages of the Americas
List of Native American languages acquired by children
 Languages of North America
 Languages of South America
 Languages of Asia
 East Asian languages
 Languages of South Asia
 Languages of Southeast Asia
 Languages of Europe
 Languages of Oceania

By special type or property 
Extinct, endangered or revived languages
 Lists of extinct languages
 List of languages by time of extinction
 Lists of endangered languages
 List of revived languages
 Regional language

By status or cultural sphere of influence 
 List of lingua francas
 List of official languages
 List of official languages by state
 List of official languages by institution
 List of the largest languages without official status (major linguistic minorities, several million speakers)
 Languages used on the Internet (includes a list of languages with the most prevalence online)
 List of mutually intelligible languages

Special types of languages
 List of creole languages
 List of mixed languages
 List of pidgins, creoles, mixed languages and cants based on Indo-European languages
 List of English-based pidgins
 List of sign languages
 List of sign languages by number of native signers
 List of constructed languages

See also  
 List of language self-study programs
 List of most commonly learned foreign languages in the United States
 List of linguists
 List of shorthand systems
 List of writing systems
 Lists of dialects and varieties
 Lists of computer languages
 Lists of programming languages
 List of ontology languages
 List of modeling languages
 List of markup languages
 Omniglot